Desmond Roy Calverley (21 November 1919 – 10 August 2016) was an Australian rules footballer who played for the Fitzroy Football Club and Richmond Football Club in the Victorian Football League (VFL).

Notes

External links 
		

1919 births
2016 deaths
Australian rules footballers from Victoria (Australia)
Fitzroy Football Club players
Richmond Football Club players